No. 41 Squadron ( or ) was a bomber unit of the Finnish Air Force formed in 1946 and based at Luonetjärvi. The squadron belonged to Flying Regiment 4. In 1951 the unit was renamed into No. 41 Squadron (Lentolaivue 41 or Le.Lv.41).

No. 41 Bomber Squadron
The No. 41 Bomber Squadron was formed in 1946. It was equipped with Fokker D.XXIs, Messerschmitt Bf 109Gs, and Bristol Blenheims. In 1951, it was renamed "No. 41 Squadron".

No. 41 Squadron

No. 41 Fighter Squadron
No. 41 Fighter Squadron (Hävittäjälentolaivue 41 or HävLLv 41) is currently the fighter training squadron of the Training Air Wing, based in Tikkakoski. It flies Hawk Mk.51s and Mk.51As. In 2009 it received the Mk.66s that were purchased from Switzerland in 2007.

Organization
1st Flight (1. Lentue)
2nd Flight (2. Lentue)
3rd Flight (3. Lentue)

41